General Council elections were held in French Sudan in December 1946 and 5 January 1947.

Electoral system
The General Council was elected using two voting lists. The First College elected 20 seats, whilst the Second College elected 30.

Results

References

French Sudan
1946 3
1946 in French Sudan
French Sudan
1947 in French Sudan
Election and referendum articles with incomplete results